is the main protagonist of the light novel, manga and anime series KonoSuba. He is voiced by Jun Fukushima in Japan and by Arnie Pantoja in English-speaking regions. He was a shut-in NEET until being sent to a parallel world and became the leader of a new party. Initially shown to be cynical and sarcastic, he can show selflessness and compassion towards his friends and competence as a leader. His main goal is to defeat the demon king and his generals to return to Japan but slowly grows to realize the aspects of his new life.

Kazuma has generally received positive reception for his unique traits and as a deconstruction of isekai protagonist, being known as one of the best Isekai protagonists while his dry sense of humour and ad-libs done by Jun Fukushima are widely praised. Contrarily, he has also received some criticisms for some of his character traits and personality, especially his acts of perversion.

Characteristics 
Kazuma is a Japanese teenager that initially dressed in a green and black tracksuit and later on, adorns a green cape with a golden stripe around the edges, a gray shirt with a white tunic, gray pants, dark brown boots with his natural attributes adorning brown hair and green eyes in the anime, while  his design in the earlier volumes of the Light Novels had black hair and black eyes to match his Japanese origin but it was later changed to match his anime counterpart.

Kazuma's personality can vary as in some cases, he can be generally erratic and tends to insult or belittle others that annoy or insult him as he's initially shown to have a pessimistic and cynical attitude towards others. He can also display behaviors of rash characteristics with instances such as leading a counter attack against the Destroyer only to end up destroying a noble's house, thus warranting his arrest. Although sometimes, he can show kindness and leadership with his party and with others, at times willingly helping out someone such as when he willingly chose to help Aqua after one of the Demon King's generals made her sad or helping Darkness with her personal familial affairs. He is also shown to display levels of laziness and a pervert due to some of his antics with other characters. Despite all of this, it has been regularly shown that he cares for all of his companions and has earned the name of "Tsundere" from Megumin for refusing to acknowledge it. Kazuma is also shown to be selfless, such as the time when he could have made Megumin learn Advanced Magic that would have enabled her to become much more of a help to the party but instead chose to boost the power of her Explosion Magic as he did not want her to sacrifice her dreams. Through flashbacks, we learn that Kazuma became a shut in NEET after seeing his childhood friend who had promised to marry him in the future riding on a senior boy's bike which traumatized him to the point where he slowly avoided going to school and interacting with people. Almost all of Kazuma's romantic knowledge comes from the various anime, visual novels and other entertainment materials he used to consume in Japan, which made him pretty inept at responding to heartfelt feelings in the beginning but he later grew close to Megumin when she confessed to him and started a relationship of 'more than friends and less than lovers' with her when he acknowledged his own feelings to Megumin.

Abilities 
His signature weapon is his sword due being more experienced in short-range melee combat. He also uses other weapons like his bow which has precise aim using his snipe skill. He can also learn a variety of other skills from other classes such as Mana Swap, Freeze, Create Water and Steal. These abilities are usually taught by other characters of varying classes but can't learn any advanced skills due to his class. Despite his class limiting himself to just using basic skills, he has shown to combine them for a more powerful attacks such as combining his ice and water skills during his rematch with Kyouya Mitsurugi. Statiscally, Kazuma is shown to be average in most traits but has above average intelligence and abnormally high luck.  Due to this, he managed to nearly put an entire casino into bankruptcy due to his consistent wins. However due to his class, Kazuma is typically slain multiple times throughout various points, usually prompting Aqua to revive him. Kazuma is most well known, however, for his underhanded tactics that he uses to compensate for his lack of raw power, such as creating earth and blowing it in the eyes of his enemies or using steal as a distraction. Thanks to his immense wealth that he gathers through the course of the series he also buys more expensive equipment such as high grade manatites to cast stronger spells.

Character biography 
As a shut-in NEET who has been heartbroken after an incident with his crush in middle school, Kazuma initially confined himself to his room playing video games and reading manga due to his lack in social confidence. This all changed after dying from acute stress reaction after attempting to save a classmate from a tractor which he mistook for a speeding truck. In the Heavenly Realm, he meets Aqua who makes fun of him over how he died and out of spite, he decides to take her to help him on his quest to defeat the Devil King. After having sufficient funds, their party grows after managing to recruit Megumin and Darkness into the party. Despite initially giving up on trying to defeat the Devil King, Kazuma and his party encounter the generals at different locations throughout various chapters in the story. During Volume 5 of the Light Novel, it is hinted that Megumin began developing romantic feelings for him and vice-versa. This later expands into a love triangle between him, Megumin and Darkness in the later volumes. Ultimately, Kazuma and Megumin engage in a state that was described as "more than friends, less than lovers".

During Volume 6, Kazuma becomes exiled from the Kingdom of Belzerg after realizing the Chivalrous Thief was Chris and reluctantly admits failure. Due his dire situation, he agrees to assist Chris in infiltrating the royal castle after a conspiracy of the royal family begins to spread word. After figuring out that Chris was the goddess Eris, he agrees to help steal the Sacred Armor Aigis but while initially failing, they manage to get the armor after Eris reveals her true identity and the armor accepts her. After engaging and defeating the other Demon Generals, Kazuma and Aqua have a talk over whether to fight the Demon King. This results in Aqua running off and attempting to face the Demon King herself. Matters are made worse when his stats are reset to 1 but after discovering that due to a lack of personal skills, he could regain his levels quickly, he ventures to the hardest dungeon available with the assistance of Wiz and Vanir. After gaining his levels back in a acceptable stance, Kazuma sets off to defeat the Demon King and rescuing Aqua from any further peril. Despite having the option to return to Japan as initially promised, Kazuma chooses to stay in Belzerg along with the rest of his friends.

In other media 
Kazuma along with other characters from his respective series make appearances in the gag-crossover Isekai Quartet. He also makes appearances within several KonoSuba video games, usually being a playable character or a main character. His most prominent video game appearance is in the side-scroller KonoSuba: God's Blessing on this Wonderful World! Revival of Beldia where he sets off to free Aqua, Megumin and Darkness from the possession of the Demon General Beldia. He also makes an appearance in the KonoSuba CD Drama although he is voiced by Ryōta Ōsaka.

Reception 
Kazuma has generally received positive reception for his role in the story as a subversion of traditional Isekai cliches that were present at the time. Rebecca Silverman of Anime News Network gave similar praise, describing him as "the most laid-back hero to find himself plopped down in a fantasy setting". Lynn of The Otaku Author praised the comedic value of his luck stat, stating that his luck perfectly balanced out his other stats and complemented his shut-in lifestyle.

While initially being more critical of Kazuma's characteristics, BanjoTheBear of The Chuuni Corner commended his nicer and comedic aspects. Similarly, Kazuma was praised by SD Pict for his character development, noting that he's gone a long way from a NEET to someone who's more outgoing and reliable. The character was also praised for the performance of Jun Fukushima. FandomSpot author R. Romero ranked him as the 3rd best Isekai protagonist in anime. MoviesRulz ranked him second among the 10 unluckiest isekai protagonists.

Kazuma has also been a nominee for the Best Boy category for the 2nd Crunchyroll Anime Awards. He has been frequently compared to Subaru Natsuki from Re:Zero − Starting Life in Another World due to their many similarities in terms of character and series premise. The comparisons were frequent enough to where they were noted in Isekai Quartet throughout several gags.

References

Primary sources 

 
 
 
 
 
 
 
 
 
 
 
 

KonoSuba
Literary characters introduced in 2012
Fantasy anime and manga characters
Male characters in anime and manga
Teenage characters in anime and manga
Fictional Japanese people in anime and manga
Fictional swordfighters in anime and manga
Fictional thieves
Fictional rope fighters
Fictional kenjutsuka
Fictional archers
Fictional assassins
Fictional stalkers
Fictional chefs
Fictional smiths
Fictional gamblers
Fictional exiles
Anime and manga characters who use magic
Anime and manga characters who can teleport
Fictional characters who can turn invisible
Fictional characters with superhuman senses
Fictional characters with extrasensory perception
Fictional characters with fire or heat abilities
Fictional characters with earth or stone abilities
Fictional characters with water abilities
Fictional characters with air or wind abilities
Fictional characters with ice or cold abilities
Fictional characters with electric or magnetic abilities
Fictional characters who can manipulate light
Fictional characters with absorption or parasitic abilities
Fictional characters with healing abilities